The Budvanian Riviera is a  long strip of the Adriatic coast surrounding the town of Budva in western Montenegro. It is part of the Montenegrin Littoral geographical region. It is located roughly along the middle of the Montenegrin coast, and is a center for Montenegrin beach tourism.

Settlements

The best known and most popular settlements along the Budva Riviera are:

 Budva
 Bečići
 Miločer
 Rafailovići
 Sveti Stefan
 Petrovac

See also 
 Tourism in Montenegro
 Riviera, featuring links to articles on the many coastal strips around the world which are known as Riviera

References 

Landforms of Montenegro
Tourism in Montenegro
Budva